The Joseph-Bernhart-Gymnasium (short form JBG) is a Gymnasium in Türkheim, Bavaria, which is named after Joseph Bernhart (1881–1969).

Einzelnachweise 

Schools in Bavaria